Heidi Jaufenthaler (born 8 November 1977) is an Austrian snowboarder. She was born in Lienz. She competed at the 1998 Winter Olympics, in giant slalom.

References 

1977 births
Living people
People from Lienz
Austrian female snowboarders
Olympic snowboarders of Austria
Snowboarders at the 1998 Winter Olympics
Sportspeople from Tyrol (state)